George Stephenson (4 February 1874 – 6 November 1918) was a notable New Zealand auctioneer, rugby player, theatrical company manager and entrepreneur. He was born in Dunedin, New Zealand in 1874.

References

1874 births
1918 deaths
Rugby union players from Dunedin
Businesspeople from Dunedin
New Zealand auctioneers